The Kunlun fault is a strike-slip fault to the north side of Tibet. The fault is seismically active, most recently causing the magnitude 7.8 2001 Kunlun earthquake. It forms the northeastern boundary of the elongate wedge of the Tibetan Plateau known as the Bayan Har block.

References

Seismic faults of Asia
Strike-slip faults
Geology of Tibet
Geology of China
Tibetan Plateau
Supershear earthquakes